Stuart Hart may refer to:

 Stu Hart (1915–2003), Canadian amateur and professional wrestler, promoter and trainer
 Stuart L. Hart, American academic, writer and theorist